Fransabank (Arabic: فرنسبنك ) is one of the oldest banks in Lebanon. Today, Fransabank Group has a consolidated presence in eight countries: Lebanon, France, Algeria, Sudan, Belarus, Iraq, UAE (Abu Dhabi) and in Ivory Coast. The Group also ranks first in terms of local branch network with 125 branches strategically spread all over the country.

History
In 1921, the Bank opened as a branch of Crédit Foncier d'Algérie et de Tunisie (CFAT).

In 1963, the bank was renamed to the new name of Société Centrale de Banque, and in 1971 was purchased by Banque Française pour le Moyen-Orient SAL (BFMO), a Lebanese banking company. After numerous mergers with other Lebanese banks, in 1982 the bank was renamed Fransabank.

See also 

 BankMed
 Banque Libano-Française
 Crédit Libanais
 Saradar Bank
 Société Générale de Banque au Liban (SGBL)
 Lebanese Swiss Bank
 List of banks in Lebanon

External links
 Official Website

References

Banks established in 1921
Banks of Lebanon
Companies based in Beirut